The Elfin Type 3 Clubman is a clubman-style automobile which was produced by Elfin Sports Cars in Australia from 1998 to 2007. It was produced in both kit car and turnkey variants. The rear end components were sourced from the Ford Escort Mark II.

References

Type 3 Clubman
Cars of Australia